Chris Hurd (born November 30, 1980) is an American football coach and former player. He is a special teams analyst at Arkansas. He was previously the Special Teams Coordinator and fullbacks and H-backs coach at Akron.

Playing career
Hurd played linebacker for North Texas from 1999 through 2003, while completing his degree in history, with a minor in criminal justice. After joining the team as a walk-on and redshirting in 1999, Hurd went on to earn a scholarship and become a four time letter-winner. He predominately played special teams and was a reserve middle linebacker in 2000 and 2001, and started at middle linebacker for his final two seasons. He was awarded the team’s Byron Gross Award (best linebacker) in both 2002 and 2003. Hurd was first-team All-Sun Belt, as well as the conference defensive player of the year, as a senior.

Coaching career

North Texas
Following his playing career, Hurd immediately joined the coaching staff at North Texas as the graduate assistant. In 2004, he worked with the strength and conditioning staff before moving on the field in 2005 to coach the tight ends. He then moved to the defensive side of the ball to work with the secondary.

Cisco College
In 2007, Hurd joined the staff at Cisco College coaching the defensive backs. During Hurd’s four-year stay, he served as the defensive coordinator for three years and the special teams coordinator for two.

Tennessee
In 2011 and 2012, Hurd was on the Tennessee football strength and conditioning staff, where he helped develop five NFL draft picks, including Cordarrelle Patterson.

Arkansas
In 2013, Hurd joined the Arkansas football staff working as a special teams quality control coach.

Florida Atlantic
From 2014 to 2016, Hurd was the special teams coordinator and tight ends coach at Florida Atlantic.

Notable players under Hurd: Buddy Howell, Devin Singletary, Greg Joseph, Tyler Cameron. Hurd was also responsible for bringing Harrison Bryant to FAU, current tight end for the Cleveland Browns.

Chattanooga
In 2017, Hurd joined the staff at Chattanooga as the special teams coordinator and running backs coach.

Akron
In 2019, Hurd followed head coach Tom Arth from Chattanooga to Akron as the special teams coordinator. He also coached the fullbacks and H-backs.

Personal life
Hurd and his wife, Emily, have four children: a son, Ryker, daughter, Landrie, and twin daughters Brynn and Bennett. 
Their daughter Bennett passed away at 17 days old. She was born with a life limiting diagnosis, but lived for 17 days. The family raises annual support for the hospice center in her memory.

References

1980 births
Living people
American football linebackers
Akron Zips football coaches
Arkansas Razorbacks football coaches
Chattanooga Mocs football coaches
Cisco Wranglers football coaches
Florida Atlantic Owls football coaches
North Texas Mean Green football coaches
North Texas Mean Green football players
Tennessee Volunteers football coaches
Junior college football coaches in the United States
People from Killeen, Texas